Simpson Spence & Young, (SSY), Simpson Spence Young, Simpson, Spence & Young Ltd. was founded in 1880 by Ernest Simpson, Lewis Spence and Captain William Young in New York City.  Ernest Louis Simpson started as a shipbroker from England. Simpson joined with shipbroker Lewis H. Spence and started Simpson & Spence in 1880. In 1882 Captain William Young joined the company and the name was changed to Simpson Spence & Young. Simpson Spence & Young opened a second office in Newcastle upon Tyne in England. Simpson son  Ernest Aldrich Simpson (1897-1958) joined the company.  The Simpson Spence & Young became very successful and becoming a worldwide shipping firm, with headquarters in London, one of the largest ship shipbrokers. Simpson Spence Young has 19 offices worldwide with over 400 people employees. Simpson Spence Young operates dry bulk, tanker ships, tugboats and has other services.

Shipping
Simpson Spence Young operates: Handysize, Handymax, Panamax and Capesize ships.  Simpson Spence Young operates: Iron Ore ships, Coal ship, Liquefied Gas ships and Grain ships. Simpson Spence Young operates harbour tugboat services.

Offices
As of 2022, Simpson Spence Young has offices in: Athens, Copenhagen, Dubai, Geneva, Hong Kong, Houston, London, Madrid, Melbourne, Mumbai, New York, Gslo, Sao Paulo, Shanghai, Singapore, Stamford, Sydney, Tokyo, Vancouver, Varna, and Zug.

SSY Finance
In 2019 Simpson Spence Young founded SSY Finance. Simpson Spence Young bought out Carnegie Bank interest the SSY Carnegie LLP, a joint venture of  Carnegie Bank and Simpson Spence Young. SSY Carnegie LLP is now SSY Finance.

SSY Valuation Services  
SSY Valuation Services is SSY analytical department for helping clients manage their shipping.

Ernest Simpson
Ernest Simpson married Wallis Warfield Spencer in 1928 and the two divorced in 1937. Later Wallis Simpson married King Edward VIII, who abdicated the British throne to marry Wallis. King Edward VIII stepped down to become the Duke of Windsor.

World War II
Simpson Spence & Young fleet of ships that were used to help the World War II effort. During World War II Simpson Spence & Young operated Merchant navy ships for the United States Shipping Board. During World War II Polarus Steamship Company was active with charter shipping with the Maritime Commission and War Shipping Administration. Simpson Spence & Young operated Liberty ships and Victory ships for the merchant navy. The ship was run by its Polarus Steamship Company crew and the US Navy supplied United States Navy Armed Guards to man the deck guns and radio.

Liberty ships
Liberty ships operated for World War II:
 SS Joseph Goldberger 
 SS Jean Baptiste Le Moyne  

World War II Tankers
SS Antiope, 1914 tanker 
SS Byron Darnton  

 Post-war Liberty ships owned:
SS Thomas L. Haley
 SS John H. Eaton 
 SS John Philip Sousa  
 SS John Roach 
 SS Spetsae  
 SS Joseph Leidy  
 SS William Few  
 SS James L. Ackerson

See also

World War II United States Merchant Navy
Aharon Solomons

References 

American companies established in 1918